Chinese Taipei national football team or Taiwan has participated in two AFC Asian Cup since it was founded.

During their participation, the team was known as Republic of China due to that time, they were recognized as the only real China, since the People's Republic of China was not a member of FIFA or AFC until 1978. Being one of Asia's most powerful teams back to 1960s, they had won third place in 1960 edition, and it was their best performance in the history of their participancy. Since 1968, Chinese Taipei had not qualified to the AFC Asian Cup.

1960 Asian Cup

All times are Korea Standard Time (UTC+9)

1968 Asian Cup

Record

References

Countries at the AFC Asian Cup
Chinese Taipei national football team